Angus MacDonnell, Scottish-Gaelic lord, died 1565.

Biography

MacDonnell was a son of Alexander MacDonnell, Lord of Islay and Kintyre (Cantire), and Catherine, daughter of the Lord of Ardnamurchan. He was killed during the battle of Glentasie on 2 May 1565.

He had the following: 
Ranald, died in 1595 at the Route, Ireland, and was buried at Bonamargy Friary.
Alexander, who had a son, Ranald Og, who fought with Alasdair Mac Colla during the War of the Three Kingdoms.

Notes

References

1565 deaths
Aonghas
16th-century Irish people
16th-century Scottish people
Year of birth unknown
People of Elizabethan Ireland